Sir Frederick Seager Hunt, 1st Baronet (27 April 1838 – 21 January 1904) was a British Conservative Party politician, and a prominent distiller.

Background and education
Hunt was born in Chippenham, Wiltshire, the second son of James Edward Hunt and Eliza Seager, eldest daughter of the distiller James Lys Seager. He attended school at St Peter's College, Westminster.

Business career
Seager Evans and Co. was founded by Hunt's Grandfather James Lys Seager and William Evans. In 1864 Hunt became a partner, and in 1872 the prior partnership with Richard and Christopher Wilson was dissolved, leaving just Frederick and James as partners in the business. James Lys Seager died a year later, making Frederick the sole proprietor from then on. During the time Hunt was involved with the company, the distillery was sited at Millbank in London, although it later moved to Deptford, in the 1920s. Their most famous product was Seagers Gin.

Political career
Hunt was elected at the 1885 general election as Member of Parliament (MP) for Marylebone West. He was re-elected in 1886 and 1892, but at the 1895 general election he stood instead in Maidstone, where he was returned unopposed. He resigned his seat in 1898 by becoming Steward of the Manor of Northstead. He was created a Baronet, of Cromwell Road in the parish of Saint Mary Abbots, Kensington, in the County of London, in 1892.

References

Sources 
National Archives Records for Seager Evans and Co. Ltd.
1841 Census, National Archives
Vanity Fair, May 1893

External links 
 

1837 births
1904 deaths
Conservative Party (UK) MPs for English constituencies
UK MPs 1885–1886
UK MPs 1886–1892
UK MPs 1892–1895
UK MPs 1895–1900
People from Chippenham
Baronets in the Baronetage of the United Kingdom